Charles Jeffaries "Charlie" Stayt (born 19 June 1962) is a British newsreader and broadcaster. He is a journalist with the BBC as a presenter for BBC Breakfast.

Early life and education
Stayt was born on 19 June 1962 in Gloucester, in the West of England. He has two older siblings. He was educated at Wycliffe College, a co-educational part-boarding independent school in Stonehouse, Gloucestershire, before going to Birmingham Polytechnic.

Career

Stayt started his career on a commercial radio station in his home town of Gloucester. Before moving into television, he worked on radio in London, hosting Capital Radio's news programme, The Way It Is and also reporting for LBC and BBC Radio 5 Live.

Stayt began his TV career working for ITN in 1995, then joined Five News as a reporter before presenting the network's prime-time bulletins and half-hour live debate programmes. He anchored Five News' coverage of the Millennium celebrations and the events of 11 September 2001 and spent a total of ten years at ITN, both as a correspondent and a presenter. He has also been a presenter for Sky News. He has hosted live "reality TV" shows Jailbreak, and Are You Telepathic.

Stayt joined BBC Breakfast in 2006, initially as a relief presenter, but in December 2007, he was confirmed as its Friday–Sunday presenter. Since January 2008, he has been the weekend presenter for BBC Breakfast, the early morning news programme broadcast on BBC One and BBC News. He moved with the programme to Salford and presents the programme Thursday-Saturday with Naga Munchetty, as well as standing in for main weekday host Dan Walker.

In August 2016, Stayt appeared in Dictionary Corner on Channel 4's Countdown for a number of episodes.

Personal life
In 1995, Stayt married Anne Fiona Breckell, with whom he has two children, Phoebe Senara (b. 1997) and Jake Hamilton (b. 2000). He lives in Twickenham, southwest London.

References

External links
 BBC Breakfast profile
 TV Newsroom

1962 births
Living people
People from Gloucester
People educated at Wycliffe College, Gloucestershire
Alumni of Birmingham City University
BBC newsreaders and journalists
5 News presenters and reporters
English broadcasters